The old town hall, Szombierki (Polish: Stary Ratusz w Szombierkach, German: Schomberg Rathaus) is a townhall building in Szombierki (a district of the city of Bytom), Poland. It used to be as the seat of the local government of the Schomberg Municipality (Until 1945), and later the Gmina Chruszczów (1945-1951).

Memorial of the Casualties of the First World War
In front of the town hall used to be a memorial of the casualties  of the First World War from Szombierki (then Schomberg), a Russian mortar captured in Kaunas. The memorial was destroyed in 1945 and the pedestal during renovations in 2009.

References

Szombierki
Szombierki
Buildings and structures in Bytom
Buildings and structures completed in 1913